Vela 1B was a military satellite developed to detect nuclear detonations to monitor compliance with the 1963 Partial Test Ban Treaty by the Soviet Union.

Launch
Vela 1B was launched on October 17, 1963, from the Cape Canaveral Air Force Station, Florida, by an Atlas-Agena launch vehicle. Vela 1B was launched along with Vela 1A and with ERS-12.

Mission
Vela 1B was one of two spin-stabilized  satellites comprising the first launch in a series of 6 Vela launches. Their objectives were to monitor nuclear weapons explosions in space and to study X-rays, gamma-rays, neutrons, and charged particles as the satellites passed through interplanetary space, the bow shock, the magnetosheath, and the magnetotail. The satellite operated in either a real-time mode (one data frame/sec) or a memory store mode (one data frame every 256 seconds). The spacecraft was operated in the real-time mode about 40% of the time and in the store mode for the rest of the time until the next Vela launch. At this time, tracking priority was given to the new spacecraft, and the older spacecraft was operated in the store mode only. There had been less and less data coverage of these satellites with each succeeding launch.

Specifications
 Height: 
 Propulsion: BE-3A AKM
 Stabilization: 120 rpm

See also 
 Vela (satellite)

References

External links 
 Vela 1. Heavens-Above
 Live Real Time Satellite Tracking. N2YO.com

1963 in spaceflight
Military space program of the United States
Derelict satellites orbiting Earth